Pri Gan (lit. Fruit Garden), also known as Prigan, is a moshav in southern Israel. Located in the Hevel Shalom area of the north-western Negev desert, it falls under the jurisdiction of Eshkol Regional Council.

History
The moshav was founded in 1981 by former residents of Priel, an Israeli settlement in Sinai which was evacuated as part of the Egyptian-Israeli Peace Treaty. Its main produce is vegetables and flowers.

References

External links
Peri Gan Negev Information Center

Moshavim
Populated places established in 1981
Gaza envelope
Populated places in Southern District (Israel)
1981 establishments in Israel